is a Japanese athlete. He competed in the men's pole vault at the 1996 Summer Olympics. He is currently a coach for Nishi Sports.

References

1971 births
Living people
Athletes (track and field) at the 1996 Summer Olympics
Japanese male pole vaulters
Olympic athletes of Japan
Place of birth missing (living people)
Japanese athletics coaches
Asian Games medalists in athletics (track and field)
Asian Games bronze medalists for Japan
Athletes (track and field) at the 1994 Asian Games
Medalists at the 1994 Asian Games